The 2007–08 Virginia Tech Hokies men's basketball team is an NCAA Division I college basketball team competing in the Atlantic Coast Conference. The Hokies lost five seniors off of their 2006–07 season team, which finished as the third place team in the conference.

Coaching staff

Roster 

Starters are indicated in bold

Schedule and results 

NIT, Quarterfinals

Virginia Tech Hokies men's basketball seasons
Virginia Tech
Virginia Tech
Virginia Tech
Virginia Tech